José Teodoro Moscoso Mora (November 26, 1910 – June 15, 1992), was a Puerto Rican businessman and politician known as "the architect of Operation Bootstrap".

Early years 
Moscoso's parents were Teodoro Moscoso Rodriguez, the founder of Farmacias Moscoso (Moscoso Pharmacies), in Ponce, Puerto Rico, and Alejandrina Mora Fajardo, from the Balearic island of Majorca, Spain. Alejandrina was pregnant when she and her husband were visiting Barcelona, Spain. Moscoso Mora was born during their visit and soon afterward the Moscosos returned to Puerto Rico. Moscoso Rodriguez attended to his pharmacy, which was located in downtown Ponce.

Schooling 
The Moscosos sent their son to New York City where he obtained his early education. Afterward he moved to Ponce and graduated from Ponce High School. After graduation he attended the Philadelphia School of Pharmacy (now the University of the Sciences in Philadelphia) to follow in his father's profession. After three years, he transferred to the University of Michigan, where he graduated in 1932. Moscoso returned to Ponce and worked in his father's pharmacy. The pharmacies, an island-wide chain, operated from their founding in 1915 until 1995 when they were sold to Farmacias El Amal, another local chain. He married Gloria Sánchez Vilella.

Entry into civil service 
Moscoso left the family business and helped win for the Ponce Housing Authority (PHA) an imperiled $2-million grant. In the midst of the Great Depression, the grant aided the construction of nearly 1,000 homes in Ponce. Moscoso's success caught the attention of various Puerto Rican government officials. In 1940, Moscoso joined the Popular Democratic Party after meeting Luis Muñoz Marín, and became instrumental in making Luis Muñoz Marín's vision of an industrialized Puerto Rico a reality.

Economic development 
In 1941, Rexford Guy Tugwell, Governor of Puerto Rico, and Luis Muñoz Marín, president of the Puerto Rican Senate, established a number of government-owned corporations. In 1942, Moscoso became Executive Director of the new agency in charge of Puerto Rico's economic development, the Puerto Rico Industrial Development Company.

Under Governor Muñoz Marín's administration, Moscoso led a project known as Operation Bootstrap. This administration realized that agriculture alone would not be able to provide employment for the burgeoning population, and sought to use the advantages of free access to the American market, plus a ready, inexpensive, and trained labor force, to rapidly industrialize the country. The country experienced rapid economic progress during the decades of 1950–1970. The ambitious project stimulated various industries through federal and local tax exemption as well as through government assistance, to invest in Puerto Rico. Moscoso succeeded in attracting worldwide capital investment to the Commonwealth; this, in turn, helped transform the island into a modern industrial society. The Economist later reported: "one century of economic development . . . achieved in a decade."

The following table shows Puerto Rico's change from agricultural to manufacturing society in terms of employment (extracted from Fernando Pico's Historia General de Puerto Rico).

Ambassador 
In May 1961, United States President John F. Kennedy named Moscoso ambassador to Venezuela. One month later Moscoso was kidnaped by leftist students at the Central University of Venezuela, while his car was turned on fire. Some unattended diplomatic documents were taken from the car before it was burned. 

Those documents, which contain a series of "recommendations" State Department to Venezuelan government were read on August 8, 1961, by Che Guevara, head of the Cuban delegation at Economic Conference of Punta del Este, Uruguay. On November 11 the president Romulo Betancourt ordered break diplomatic relations with Cuba. Earlier, the Mexican government had agreed to host the hundred Cuban refugees who were at the Venezuelan embassy in Havana, hoping to leave their country. In November Moscoso was named coordinator of Kennedy's Alliance for Progress and returned to Washington.

After the Kennedy assassination, Moscoso returned to Puerto Rico. In 1966, Moscoso headed the Commonwealth Oil Refining Co. ("CORCO"). From 1973 to 1976 Moscoso became again the head of "Fomento".

Death 
Teodoro Moscoso died on June 15, 1992.

Legacy 

A 2.25-kilometer bridge connecting the Hato Rey/Río Piedras sectors of San Juan, Puerto Rico with the Luis Muñoz Marín International Airport bears the name of Teodoro Moscoso. The bridge, over the San José Lagoon, is the longest bridge over a body of water in Puerto Rico. In Ponce he is honored at the Illustrious Ponce Citizens Plaza in Tricentennial Park.

See also 
Economy of Puerto Rico
List of Puerto Ricans
History of Puerto Rico

References

Further reading

External links 
The Development Hall of Fame: Inductees

1932 births
1992 deaths
Popular Democratic Party (Puerto Rico) politicians
People from Barcelona
Ambassadors of the United States to Venezuela
Businesspeople from Ponce
University of Michigan alumni